Marianne James (born 18 February 1962) is a French singer, writer, actress, TV host and fashion designer. She has co-presented the French coverage of the Eurovision Song Contest.

Early life
Born in Montélimar, Marianne Gandolfi grew up in the family shop, Place du Marché, with her father Maurice, chocolatier pastry chef and nougatier, her mother Jacqueline, from whom she gets her Italian origins, and her sister Pascale, four years older than her.

She took guitar lessons at the age of 11 with Antoine Petrucciani, known as "Tony", a renowned jazz guitarist and father of pianist Michel Petrucciani. From the age of 15 to 23, she took advantage of her holidays to sing in the streets with her sister and a friend.

In 1980, after creating her first group "The Swingums", she graduated with a degree in musicology from Sorbonne University and won a first prize for singing at the Conservatoire de Paris.

In 1981, Marianne James joined the band "Les Démones Loulou" with whom she opened for William Sheller at the Olympia. She continued to sing in the streets of Paris.

Theater

Album
 1999 : Les Mandarines
 2006 : Marianne James
 2015 : Les Symphonies Subaquatiques
 2016 : Tous au lit !
 2018 : Tous heureux !

Television

Filmography

Actress

Dubbing

References

External links 

 

1962 births
Living people
French women singers
French-language singers
French film actresses
French television actresses
French fashion designers
French voice actresses
French people of Italian descent
21st-century French actresses
People from Montélimar
French women fashion designers
La France a un incroyable talent